Sertoli cell-only syndrome (a.k.a. Del Castillo syndrome and germ cell aplasia ) is a disorder characterized by male sterility without sexual abnormality. It describes a condition of the testes in which only Sertoli cells line is present in seminiferous tubules.

Presentation
Sertoli cell-only syndrome patients normally have normal secondary male features and have normal or small-sized testes.

Pathophysiology
Sertoli cell-only syndrome is likely multifactorial, and is characterized by severely reduced or absent spermatogenesis; because of the presence of  Sertoli cells alone lining the seminiferous tubules. A substantial subset of men with this uncommon syndrome have microdeletions in the Yq11 region of the Y chromosome, an area known as the AZF (azoospermia factor) region. In particular, sertoli cell only syndrome (SCO) correlates with AZFa microdeletions. It is possible to recognize two types of SCO: SCO type 1 shows total absence of spermatogonia because of an altered migration of primordial germ cells from yolk sac to gonadal ridges; SCO type 2 is instead due to a subsequent damage and shows the presence of rare spermatogonia in a minority of tubules.

Diagnosis
Testicular biopsy would confirm the absence of spermatozoa. Seminal plasma protein TEX101 was proposed for differentiation of Sertoli cell-only syndrome from maturation arrest and hypospermatogenesis. A clinical trial at Mount Sinai Hospital, Canada started testing this hypothesis in 2016.

Treatment
Sertoli cell-only syndrome is like other non-obstructive azoospermia (NOA). Cases are managed by sperm retrieval through testicular sperm extraction (TESE), micro-surgical testicular sperm extraction (mTESE), or testicular biopsy. On retrieval of viable sperm this could be used in intracytoplasmic sperm injection.

In 1979, Levin described germinal cell aplasia with focal spermatogenesis where a variable percentage of seminiferous tubules contain germ cells. It is important to discriminate between the two types in view of ICSI.

A retrospective analysis performed in 2015 detailed the outcomes of 148 men with non-obstructive azoospermia and diagnosed Sertoli cell-only syndrome:
 Men with SCOS: 148
 Testicular sperm was successfully retrieved: 35/148
 Successful ICSI: 20/148
 Clinical pregnancy: 4/148

This study considers the effect of FSH levels on clinical success, and it excludes abnormal karyotypes. All patients underwent MD-TESE in Iran. Ethnicity and genetic lineage may affect treatment of azoospermia.

References

External links 

Endocrine gonad disorders
Syndromes
Genetic diseases and disorders
Congenital disorders of male genital organs